Coats Island (Inuktitut: ᐊᑉᐸᑑᕐᔪᐊᖅ, Appatuurjuaq) lies at the northern end of Hudson Bay in the Kivalliq Region of Nunavut. At  in size, it is the 107th largest island in the world, and Canada's 24th largest island.

The island has areas of federal crown land and areas of private land owned by Inuit, however, the last permanent residents left in the 1970s. With no permanent settlements, the island is also the largest uninhabited island in the northern hemisphere south of the Arctic Circle. It was the last home of the Sadlermiut people who are widely believed to represent the Dorset culture.

Geography
This high point occurs along the rocky northern perimeter between Cape Pembroke and Cape Prefontaine. The underlying rocks in this area are Precambrian metamorphics. The southern half of the island is primarily low-lying muskeg and made up of Palaeozoic sedimentary rocks, such as limestone and sandstone.

Fauna
Since 1920, Coats Island has been designated a caribou reserve. After caribou were extirpated from nearby Southampton Island, the Coats herd was used to re-establish the Southampton herd. It is also known for its population of thick-billed murre. Two colonies of 30,000 birds occur along the cliffs at the rocky northern end. There are also significant concentrations of walrus at walrus haulouts at the base of cliffs or on offshore islands at the northern end of the island (one each at Cape Pembroke and Cape Prefontaine). These are visited regularly by Inuit from the hamlet at Coral Harbour, on Southampton Island, for harvesting.

Cape Pembroke is an Important Bird Area.

History
The first recorded sighting of Coats Island by Europeans was in 1612 by Thomas Button; he explored it further the following year. It received its name from William Coats, a sea captain for the Hudson's Bay Company. He visited the area periodically between 1727 and 1751.

In 1824, HMS Griper, under Captain George Francis Lyon, anchored off Cape Pembroke on Coats Island. The whalers then discovered a band of "Eskimos" who were said to have spoken a "strange dialect" and were called Sadlermiut. Since then, the Sadlermiut continued to establish contact with Westerners. However, as with many North American aboriginals, the Sadlermiut were often susceptible to Western diseases.

The area was confirmed to be an island by American whalers, who began visiting the area in the 1860s. By 1896, there were only 70 of Sadlermiut remaining. Then, in the fall of 1902, the British trading and whaling vessel named the Active had made a stop at Cape Low, Southampton Island. It is said that some of the Sadlermiut caught a disease, possibly an influenza, typhoid or typhus, from a sick sailor aboard the Active, which then spread to the entire community. By winter 1902–03, the entire Sadlermiut population had died as a result.

A Hudson's Bay Company trading post was maintained on the island from August 1920 to August 1924, and a number of Inuit families lived on the island during that period, some of whom had been brought from Baffin Island on boats. In 1921, an overturned fisherman's dory covering two skeletons was found by Capt. George Cleveland on Coats Island which were alleged to be the remains of Captain Arthur Gibbons and one of his officers, survivors of the wreck of the American whaling schooner A. T. Gifford. The Canadian Government held a criminal investigation.

References 

Islands of Hudson Bay
Uninhabited islands of Kivalliq Region
Hudson's Bay Company trading posts in Nunavut
Former populated places in the Kivalliq Region